Baraeus plagiatus is a species of beetle in the family Cerambycidae. It was described by Hintz in 1919. It is known from Cameroon.

References

Endemic fauna of Cameroon
Pteropliini
Beetles described in 1919